Mount St. Mary's Mountaineers men's lacrosse is a National Collegiate Athletic Association (NCAA) division I men's college lacrosse team representing Mount St. Mary's University in the Metro Atlantic Athletic Conference (MAAC). The Mountaineers earned regular season conference titles in 1999, 2001, 2010, 2011, and 2019, won conference tournament championships in 2001, 2003, 2010, and 2011, and faced the University of Virginia in their 2003 and 2010 NCAA Division I men's lacrosse tournament appearances.

Current season 

Mount St. Mary's Mountaineers head coach Tom Gravante was assisted by coaches Kevin Giblin, Nick Kellinger, and Ted Moon for the 2023 season.

Athletic divisions and conferences

Team records

Individual awards 

NEC First Team, All Conference
 Russell Moncure (2010)
 Bryant Schmidt (2010, 2011, 2012)
 T.C. DiBartolo (2010, 2011)
 Cody Lehrer (2010)
 Brett Schmidt (2011, 2013)
 Andrew Scalley (2011, 2012, 2013)
 Bubba Johnson (2016)
 Jack Mangan (2019)
 Bryan McIntosh (2019)
 Dylan Furnback (2019)

NEC Second Team, All Conference
 Matt Nealis (2010)
 Brett Schmidt (2010, 2012)
 Ben Trapp (2011)
 Cody Lehrer (2011)
 Kevin Downs (2012)
 John Anderson (2013)
 Mark Hojnoski (2016)
 Jack Mangan (2017)
 Chris DiPretoro (2019)
 Luke Frankeny (2019)
 Joshua Davies (2019)
 Bryan McIntosh (2019, 2021)

NEC All Rookie Team
 Andrew Scalley (2010)
 Brett Schmidt (2010)
 Bryant Schmidt (2010)
 Kevin Downs (2011)
 Kyle O’Brien (2012)
 Matt Vierheller (2015)
 Nick Firman (2015)
 Chris DiPretoro (2016)
 Jack Mangan (2016)
 Henry Berg (2018)
 Bryan McIntosh (2018)
 Sam Stephan (2018)
 Jared McMahon (2019)

NEC Offensive Player of the Year
 Andrew Scalley (2013)

NEC Defensive Player of the Year
 T.C. DiBartolo (2011)
 Dylan Furnback (2019)

NEC Rookie of the Year
 Andrew Scalley (2010)

NEC Coach of the Year
 Tom Gravante (2010, 2011, 2019)

NEC All Tournament Team
 T.C. DiBartolo (2011)
 Andrew Scalley (2011, 2012)
 Brett Schmidt (2011, 2012)
 Cody Lehrer (2011)
 Christian Kellett (2012)
 Nick Firman (2015)
 Matt Vierheller (2015)
 Jack Mangan (2019)
 Brenden McCarthy (2019)

NEC Tournament MVP
 T.C. DiBartolo (2011)

NEC Player of the Week
 Andrew Scalley, 8x (2010, 2012, 2013)
 Brett Schmidt, 3x (2011)
 Cody Lehrer, 2x (2010)
 Mark Hojnoski (2016)
 Brenden McCarthy (2018)
 Cormac Giblin (2022)

NEC Defensive Player of the Week
 T.C. DiBartolo, 5x (2010, 2011)
 Dylan Furnback, 3x (2019)
 Ben Trapp (2011)
 Chris Klaiber (2012)
 Frankie McCarthy (2016)
 Matt Vierheller (2017)
 Joshua Davies (2019)
 Griffin McGinley (2022)

NEC Rookie of the Week
 Andrew Scalley, 2x (2010)
 Brett Schmidt (2010)
 Bryant Schmidt (2010)
 Braedon Graham (2012)
 Matt Vierheller, 2x (2015)
 Mike Moynihan (2015)
 Chris DiPretoro (2016)
 Brenden McCarthy (2017)
 Luke Frankeny (2018)
 Dylan Furnback (2018)
 Jared McMahon (2019)

USA Lacrosse Player of the Week
 Griffin McGinley (2022)

USILA All American
 T.C. DiBartolo (2010)

USILA Scholar All American
 Sam Stephan (2021)
 Noah Daniels (2022)

College Crosse All Freshman Team
 Steven Schmitt, Honorable Mention (2020)

Lacrosse Bucket Team of the Week
 Griffin McGinley (2022)

Professional draftees 

Major League Lacrosse (MLL)
 T.C. DiBartolo, Chesapeake Bayhawks (2012)
 Brett Schmidt, Rochester Rattlers (2013)
 Bryant Schmidt, Rochester Rattlers (2013 supplemental)
 Jack Mangan, Atlanta Blaze (2019)

Premier Lacrosse League (PLL)
 Bryan McIntosh, Cannons Lacrosse Club (2022)

References

External links
 

NCAA Division I men's lacrosse teams
Mount St. Mary's Mountaineers men's lacrosse